Pablo Antonio Zalaquett Said (born July 9, 1963) is a business administrator, Chilean former mayor of the commune of Santiago and member of the UDI, a member of the Alliance for Chile.

Eisenhower Fellowships selected Pablo Zalaquett in 1999 to represent Chile.

References

1963 births
Living people
Chilean people of Palestinian descent
Chilean businesspeople
Independent Democratic Union politicians
Mayors of Santiago
20th-century Chilean lawyers
21st-century Chilean lawyers